WBGG may refer to:

 WBGG (AM), a radio station (970 AM) licensed to Pittsburgh, Pennsylvania, United States
 WBGG-FM, a radio station (105.9 FM) licensed to Fort Lauderdale, Florida, United States
 the ICAO code for Kuching International Airport
 WABY, a radio station (900 AM) licensed to Watervliet, New York, United States, which held the call sign WBGG from 1992 to 1994